Mary Alvis Draper (April 4, 1719 – 1810) is known for the help she gave members of the Continental Army during the American Revolution. Her story is told in Elizabeth F. Ellet's The Women of the American Revolution (1848).

Mary Draper was born Mary Alvis her parents where Nathaniel Alvis and Mary Chickering. She had one sister, one half sister, and one half brother. She had been married and widowed before marrying Captain Moses Draper of Dedham, Massachusetts. They had six children, five boys and one girl. Together they showed their patriotism for America in using all resources possible in order to aid in the hunger and well-being of the soldiers during war by handing out large pans of cheese and bread. "Her husband before joining the army had purchased a mold for casting bullets, and Mrs. Draper herself now transformed her platters, pans, and dishes into balls for the guns of the Continental Army"

Mary Draper was once again widowed in 1775 at the age of 56 just three months before the battle of Lexington. Her oldest son, Moses, joined the Patriot army. He was 31 and had a family of his own. She helped to the best of her abilities by giving food and servicing the wounded. She housed many people who were homeless as a result of war. She was helped by two neighbor boys to pour large pails of cider into tubs. After her food supply began to run out neighbors helped until the worst of the need had passed. Her daughter Kate and her maid helped her make their own cloth into coats for the Colonial soldiers, sheets and blankets were made into shirts and flannel already made up into her clothes was turned into men's clothing. She also melted family heirlooms for bullets and gave them to the soldiers in war. Mary Draper was an influence on the American Revolution. Her view on war was that she wanted to go to war to gain American freedom. She died at the age of 91.

References

External links
Mary Draper, at AmericanRevolution.ORG

1719 births
1810 deaths
Women in the American Revolution
People from colonial Dedham, Massachusetts
People of Massachusetts in the American Revolution